Noor-e-Zindagi is a Pakistani drama serial that first aired on Geo Entertainment on 15 July 2016. It was produced by Abdullah Kadwani and Asad Qureshi. The turmoil of opposite nature marriages and a woman's noble struggle to save her marriage is explained with responsibility in the serial.

Cast 
Ayesha Khan as Noor Jahan
Syed Jibran as Saleem
Shakeel as Noor's father
Noman Habib as Waseem (Saleem's younger brother)
Faria Sheikh as Zebo (Noor's younger sister)
Sajida Syed as Saleem and Waseem's mother
Esha Noor as Gulshan
Farah Nadir as Gulshan's mother
Anam Tanveer as Gulshan (Gulshan's elder sister)
Ayesha Khan as Noor's mother
Humaira Bano as Noor's elder sister's (Mehrunissa) mother-in-law
Saleem Mairaj as Saleem's friend
Sumaiyya Bukhsh as Mano (Saleem's younger sister)

Soundtrack 
The original soundtrack of Noor-e-Zindagi was composed and sung by Shuja Haider and Rosemary. The song is available on Patari.

Broadcast and Release
The serial premiered on Geo Entertainment, airing the episode at prime time, from 15 July 2015. It was also aired on Geo Kahani.
Since 20 April 2020, it became available for streaming on Amazon Prime. It's also available for streaming on MX Player in India.

Awards and nominations

References

External links
Noor-e-Zindagi - IMDb
Noor-e-Zindagi Official site

A&B Entertainment
7th Sky Entertainment
Pakistani drama television series
2016 Pakistani television series debuts
2017 Pakistani television series endings
Urdu-language television shows
Geo TV original programming